Aboccis or Abuncis was a town in Aethiopia, between the Second Cataract and Syene (modern Aswan), situated on the left bank of the Nile mentioned by Ptolemy, and Pliny the Elder. It was renowned on account of the two magnificent grotto temples, which were discovered at this place by Giovanni Battista Belzoni. The walls of the larger of the two temples were covered with paintings, which recorded the victories of Ramses III over various nations of Africa and Asia. William Smith identifies the place with Abu Simbel.

References

Classical geography
Roman sites in Egypt
Archaeological sites in Egypt
Ancient Greek geography of North Africa
Abu Simbel